The History of Chelsea F.C. spans the period from 1905 to the present day:

History of Chelsea F.C. (1905–1952)
History of Chelsea F.C. (1952–1983)
History of Chelsea F.C. (1983–2003)
History of Chelsea F.C. (2003–2022)
History of Chelsea F.C. (2022–present)

For a season-by-season account of Chelsea's history, see List of Chelsea F.C. seasons.

See also